is a former Japanese football player.

Playing career
Kenichi Nozawa played for JEF Reserves, Sagawa Printing and AC Nagano Parceiro from 2006 to 2014.

References

External links

1984 births
Living people
Rissho University alumni
Association football people from Nagano Prefecture
Japanese footballers
J3 League players
Japan Football League players
SP Kyoto FC players
AC Nagano Parceiro players
Association football midfielders